Wilhelmus Frederikus ("Willem") Winkelman (14 July 1887 – 1 July 1990) was a Dutch track and field athlete who competed in the 1908 Summer Olympics. He was born in Delfshaven and died in Voorburg.

In 1908 he was eliminated in the first round of the 3500 metre walk competition as well as of the 10 mile walk event.

References

External links
list of Dutch athletes
Biography and statistics at Sports-reference.com

1887 births
1990 deaths
Dutch male racewalkers
Olympic athletes of the Netherlands
Athletes (track and field) at the 1908 Summer Olympics
Dutch centenarians
Athletes from Rotterdam
Men centenarians